The 1993–94 Ranji Trophy was the 60th season of the Ranji Trophy. Bombay defeated Bengal by 8 wickets in the final.

Final

Scorecards and averages
Cricketarchive

References

External links

Ranji Trophy
Ranji Trophy
Ranji Trophy seasons